Onikwu is a community in Rivers State, Nigeria. Onikwu is self-contained district or community within Ndoni town, distance is about 6.4 km from Ndoni to Onikwu. The name "Oni-kwu/Nd-oni, Ndoni also pronounce Nde-Oni means Oni people while Oni-ukwu meaning the elder of Oni people. In Ukwuani-Aboh-Ndoni language (Igboid) ukwu means elder, and Nde means people of. Onikwu and Ndoni are of same ethnic group located in Ogba Egbema/Ndoni Local government of Rivers State. The community alongside them have other neighboring villages which include Ase-Azaga, Isukwa, Odugiri. Agwe, Ugbaja, Isala Ase-Imoniteh and Ogbe-Ogene. All of the said communities are located in the Central Niger Delta region, south-south Nigeria.

Origin
The (Onikwu/Ndoni) are related to the Aboh people of Ndokwa Nation, present day Delta State and Edo State. Onikwu/Ndoni people are Aboh origin. They share the same linguistic and cultural heritage with other Igbo-related ethnic groups like Ukwuani, Ikwerre, Anioma people, Ika, and Ekpeye. They Speak Ndoni, a variant of the Ndokwa Ukwuani language. It is important to note that Ukwuani-Eboh-Ndoni language is among the 26 languages approved by the Federal Govt of Nigeria for mother tongue education.

Culture/Language

The people of Onikwu always observe their festival known as Udi-Yeli once in every year between February and March, the Onikwu people has no king but opkala one of the most aged among the elders in the community. The king was shifted from Onikwu to Ndoni town for every long time due to the less population of the Onikwu people in other world minor in population when compare with Ndoni people. At earlier settlement the Onikwu people are said to hold and the keeper of the Ofor of the land which the use to perform their traditional rights. At the end of the Onikwu Udi-Yeli, the Ndoni community commences its own as well called Udi-Yeli this is generally believed to be this way because the Onikwu is their elder of the land. At the end of Onikwu Udi-Yeli the people of Ndoni comes to perform some traditional dance like Nmanwu (spirit) a masquerade.

Language

Ukwuani-Aboh-Ndoni language is an Igboid Language, sometimes considered as a dialect of the main Igbo language group. Onikwu and Ndoni people share lots of cultural and linguistic grounds with Igbo and Bini people.

Notable people

Traditional ruler: HRH, Gabriel Obi the Awor and okpala-ukwu of Ndoni("Monarch canvasses dev," 2010) known as the king of the region.

The area has produced prominent sons and daughters, which includes: Chief (Dr.) Ifeanyi Odili from Umuokeye Ndoni community, he was educated at Corydon Technical College, London and the London School of Economics where he obtained his first degree. He joined Lonhro limited in London and later deployed to Beirut, Lebanon, where he served for many years. He thereafter ventured into private business and later became the Chairman of Aeromaritime Group of Companies in 1975. He is a Director of many successful Companies including Baco Line of Germany and MTN Nigeria Limited("Brawal shipping limited ," 2012).

Peter Odili from Umu-onyema Ndoni. He graduated from the Medical School of the University of Nigeria, Nsukka, and pursued post-graduate work in Tropical Medicine at the University of Liverpool in the United Kingdom. Dr. Peter Odili is married to Justice Mary Okaego Odili (born. 12 May 1952).

In 1988/89, Peter Odili was elected member and leader of Rivers State Delegates to the Constituent Assembly. In 1992, he was elected as the Deputy Governor of Rivers State. After the Nigerian Third Republic ended, he was again elected to the National Constitutional Conference and became the Conference Committee Chairman on State Creation. Dr. Odili thereafter became the National Secretary of the defunct Democratic Party of Nigeria (DPN)

Peter Odili was elected governor of Rivers State in April 1999, and was reelected in April 2003 and completed his tenure 2007.

Agnes Okoh from Ogbe-ukwu Ndoni, a prophetess and founder of Christ Holy Church International(Oduro, 2007.) Also she is the grandmother of Most Rev. Daniel C. Okoh the General Overseer of the Christ Holy Church International, Vice President of the Christian Association of Nigeria, and President of the Organisation of African Instituted Churches.

The Osanakpo Family from Umu-olodu notable as industrialist and within the business circle.

Dr. Nnamdi Obiosa, from Onikwu a notable Onikwu son.

Season/2012 Flood

Nigeria, like the rest of West Africa and other tropical lands, has only two seasons. These are the Dry season and the Rainy season. The dry season is accompanied by a dust laden airmass from the Sahara Desert, locally known as Harmattan, or by its main name, The Tropical Continental (CT) airmass, while the rainy season is heavily influenced by an airmass originating from the south Atlantic Ocean, locally known as the south west wind, or by its main name, The Tropical Maritime (MT) airmass. These two major wind systems in Nigeria are known as the trade winds.
The region Onikwu/Ndoni is flood prone communities, this is because the inland part of Rivers state consists of tropical rainforest; towards the coast the typical Niger Delta environment features many mangrove swamps, beside that the communities lies along the Niger Delta Central coastal region.

In October 2012, villages like Ndoni, Ase-Azaga, Isukwa, Odugiri. Agwe, Onikwu, Ugbaja, Isala and Ogbe-Ogene were badly hit by the flood.

References

Sources 
 Wikina, B. (2011, March 9). Gov. amaechi commends onelga people….gets chieftaincy title in ndoni featured. Retrieved from http://www.riversstate.gov.ng/item/429-gov-amaechi-commends-onelga-peoplegets-chieftaincy-title-in-ndoni.html
 Ukwuani-aboh-ndoni. (n.d.). Retrieved from http://www.ethnologue.com/show_language.asp?code=ukw
 Oduro, T. (2007). Christ holy church international . Retrieved from https://web.archive.org/web/20160708171340/http://dacb.org/stories/nigeria/okoh_agnes.html
 Monarch canvasses dev training for youths. (2010, November 26). Retrieved from http://www.thetidenewsonline.com/2010/11/26/monarch-canvasses-dev-training-for-youths/
 Onukwugha, A. (2012, October 10). Rivers flood: Tear flows freely in 24 communities. Retrieved from http://www.leadership.ng/nga/articles/36828/2012/10/08/rivers_flood_tear_flows_freely_24_communities.html

Populated places in Rivers State